Dossenheim-Kochersberg is a commune in the Bas-Rhin department in Grand Est in north-eastern France.

See also
 Communes of the Bas-Rhin department
 Kochersberg

References

External links

Official website

Communes of Bas-Rhin